Kaapor (Ka’apor, Kaaporté), also known as "Urubú," "Caapor" or Urubú-Kaapor, is a Tupi–Guarani language spoken as a primary language by the Ka'apor people of Brazil. The language is also spoken as a second language by non-Ka'apor ethnic groups, including Tembé. 

There is a high incidence of congenital deafness among the Kaapor people, most of whom grow up bilingual in Urubu-Kaapor Sign Language, which may be indigenous to them.

References

 

Tupi–Guarani languages